Underground Railroad is a live album by saxophonist and composer Joe McPhee recorded in 1969 at the Holy Cross Monastery and originally released on the CjR label, then reissued by Atavistic in 2001 with a bonus concert from the same venue.

Reception

The Allmusic review by Thom Jurek stated "There are conical sound explorations between brass and reed and between reed and reed. Tonal variants are evoked in order to up the emotional content of the music, which is already so loaded it's a miracle it doesn't fall apart... This set is one of the most essential recordings of late-'60s free jazz, and anybody remotely interested in the period needs to hear it". On All About Jazz, Robert Spencer noted "this set shows conclusively that McPhee’s massive talent was at his disposal from the onset of his earliest efforts. Any fan of ecstatic free jazz shouldn’t pass this one up!".

Track listing 
All compositions by Joe McPhee except as indicated

Disc One:
 "Underground Railroad" - 22:49
 "Harriet" - 11:11
 "Message From Denmark" - 9:55
 "New Spiritual No. 1" - 14:23 Bonus track on CD reissue 		
 "E=MC2" (Reggy Marks) - 9:52 Bonus track on CD reissue
Disc Two:
 "Justice (Evidence)" (Thelonious Monk) - 8:19 Bonus track on CD reissue 		
 "Windy City Head Stompin' Blues" - 12:29 Bonus track on CD reissue 		
 "Birmingham Sunday/Morning Song/Lament/Hymn of the Dragon Kings" - 25:41 Bonus track on CD reissue
 "Spain Adios" (Marks) - 12:57 Bonus track on CD reissue

Personnel 
Joe McPhee - tenor saxophone, pocket trumpet, trumpet, alto horn
Reggie Marks - tenor saxophone, soprano saxophone, flute
Otis Greene - alto saxophone, harmonica (Disc Two)
Joe Virgillio - tenor saxophone, soprano saxophone (Disc Two)
Tyrone Crabb - bass
Ernest Bostic - drums, percussion, vibraphone

References 

Joe McPhee live albums
1969 live albums
Atavistic Records live albums